Francisco Rodríguez may refer to:

Sports

Baseball
Frank Rodriguez (born 1972), pitcher for the Minnesota Twins and Seattle Mariners
Francisco Rodríguez (Venezuelan pitcher) (born 1982), relief pitcher who is nicknamed "K-Rod"
Francisco Rodríguez (Mexican pitcher) (born 1983), Mexican League, Tigres de Quintana Roo

Boxing
Francisco Rodríguez (boxer, born 1945), Venezuelan boxer
Francisco Rodriguez (boxer, born 1984) (1984–2009), American boxer
Francisco Rodríguez Jr. (born 1993), Mexican boxer

Cycling
Francisco Rodríguez (cyclist, born 1906) (1906–?), Argentine cyclist
Francisco Rodríguez (cyclist, born 1915) (1915–1998), Mexican cyclist
Francisco Rodríguez Maldonado (born 1960), Colombian cyclist

Football
Francisco Javier Rodríguez (born 1981), Mexican footballer
Francisco Rodríguez García (born 1934), Spanish footballer
Francisco (footballer, born 1978) (Francisco Javier Rodríguez, born 1978), Spanish footballer and manager
Francisco Rodríguez (Swiss footballer) (born 1995), Swiss footballer
Francisco Rodríguez (footballer, born 1993), Costa Rican footballer

Other sports
Francisco Rodríguez (rower) (born 1953), Cuban Olympic rower
Francisco Rodríguez (Spanish judoka) (born 1957), Spanish Olympic judoka
Francisco Rodríguez (tennis) (born 1976), Paraguayan tennis player
Francisco Rodríguez (Puerto Rican judoka) (born 1970), Puerto Rican Olympic judoka
 (born 1980), Spanish volleyball player

Other uses
Francisco Rodríguez Adrados (born 1922), Spanish Hellenist
Francisco Rodríguez Pascual (1927–2007), Spanish humanist and anthropologist
Francisco Rodríguez (President of Panama) (born 1938), in 1989
Francisco Rodríguez Barrientos (born 1956), Costa Rican writer and sociologist
Frankie A. Rodriguez (born 1996), American actor
Francisco Rodríguez (economist), Venezuelan economist

See also
Frank Rodriguez, rock organist with Question Mark & the Mysterians
Francisco Rodrigues (disambiguation)